The 39th annual Venice International Film Festival was held from 28 August to 2 September 1982.

Jury
The following people comprised the 1982 jury:
 Marcel Carné (France) (head of jury)
 Luis García Berlanga (Spain)  
 Mario Monicelli (Italy)    
 Gillo Pontecorvo (Italy) 
 Valerio Zurlini (Italy) 
 Satyajit Ray (India) 
 Andrei Tarkovsky (Soviet Union)

Films in competition

Mezzogiorno-Mezzanotte
A section devoted to spectacular films (Spielberg's Raiders of the Lost Ark and E.T.), remakes (Vertigo, Leave Her to Heaven) or eccentrics.

Awards
The following awards were presented at the 39th edition:

Official selection
In Competition
Golden Lion - The State of Things (Der Stand der Dinge) by Wim Wenders
Special Jury Prize - Imperative (Imperativ) by Krzysztof Zanussi
Silver Lion for Best First Work - Sciopèn by Luciano Odorisio & The Hes Case (De smaak van water) by Orlow Seunke
Special Awards
Career Golden Lion - Marcel Carné, Alessandro Blasetti, Luis Buñuel, Frank Capra, George Cukor, Jean-Luc Godard, Sergei Yutkevich, Alexander Kluge, Akira Kurosawa, Michael Powell, Satyajit Ray, King Vidor and Cesare Zavattini.

Collateral Awards
FIPRESCI Prize
Agony (Elem Klimov) 
The State of Things (Wim Wenders)
OCIC Award
Fünf letzte Tage (Percy Adlon)
Honorable Mention - Imperative (Krzysztof Zanussi)
UNICEF Award 
De smaak van water (Orlow Seunke)
Pasinetti Award
Best Film - Imperative (Krzysztof Zanussi)
Best Actor - Max von Sydow (Flight of the Eagle)
Best Actress - Susan Sarandon (Tempest)
Pietro Bianchi Award
Renato Castellani
Best Artistic Collaboration
Mikhail Ulyanov (Private Life)
Golden Phoenix
Best Actor - Robert Powell (Imperative)
Best Actress - Béatrice Romand (Le Beau Mariage)

References

External links
 
 Venice Film Festival 1982 Awards on IMDb
 Venice Film Festival, September 1982, photos by Raymond Depardon (quote: "Twenty-eight films competed for the Golden Lion...")

1982 film festivals
Venice
Venice
Venice Film Festival
Film
August 1982 events in Europe
September 1982 events in Europe